Gendarmstien (English: Border Guard Trail) is a hiking trail going along the eastern part of the Denmark-Germany border. It is a part of the E6 trail.

[
{
  "type": "ExternalData",
  "service": "geoline",
  "ids": "Q55467788",
  "properties": {
    "title": "Bjergetapen",
    "stroke": "#ff0000",
    "stroke-width": 3
  }
},{
  "type": "ExternalData",
  "service": "geoline",
  "ids": "Q55467634",
  "properties": {
    "title": "Tegletapen",
    "stroke": "#55aa00",
    "stroke-width": 3
  }
},{
  "type": "ExternalData",
  "service": "geoline",
  "ids": "Q55467901",
  "properties": {
    "title": "Krageetapen",
    "stroke": "#5500ff",
    "stroke-width": 3
  }
},{
  "type": "ExternalData",
  "service": "geoline",
  "ids": "Q55468258",
  "properties": {
    "title": "Strandetapen",
    "stroke": "#ffff00",
    "stroke-width": 3
  }
},{
  "type": "ExternalData",
  "service": "geoline",
  "ids": "Q55468359",
  "properties": {
    "title": "Mølleetapen",
    "stroke": "#aa0000",
    "stroke-width": 3
  }
},
]

References

External links
Gendarmsti.dk
Traildino.com
Waymarked Trails

Hiking trails in Denmark